Gunnar Johansson (23 March 1919 – 11 December 1998) was a Swedish sprint canoeist who competed from the late 1930s to the late 1940s. He won two medals at the 1938 ICF Canoe Sprint World Championships in Vaxholm with a gold in the K-2 10000 m and a bronze in the K-4 1000 m events.

Johannsson also competed at the 1948 Summer Olympics in the C-2 1000 m and C-2 10000 m events, finishing sixth in both.

References

SOC profile

1919 births
1998 deaths
Canoeists at the 1948 Summer Olympics
Olympic canoeists of Sweden
Swedish male canoeists
ICF Canoe Sprint World Championships medalists in kayak